The Fernald Feed Materials Production Center (commonly referred to simply as Fernald or later NLO) is a Superfund site located within Crosby Township in Hamilton County, Ohio, as well as Ross Township in Butler County, Ohio. It was a uranium processing facility located near the rural town of New Baltimore, about 20 miles (32 km) northwest of Cincinnati, which fabricated uranium fuel cores for the U.S. nuclear weapons production complex from 1951 to 1989. During that time, the plant produced 170,000 metric tons uranium (MTU) of metal products and 35,000 MTU of intermediate compounds, such as uranium trioxide and uranium tetrafluoride.

Fernald came under criticism in 1984 when it was learned that the plant was releasing millions of pounds of uranium dust into the atmosphere, causing major radioactive contamination of the surrounding areas. News about the plant's operations led to the 1989 closure of nearby Fort Scott Camp, then the oldest Roman Catholic summer camp in the country.

History
In 1948 the Atomic Energy Commission, predecessor to the U.S. Department of Energy, established "a large scale integrated facility for the production of fabricated uranium fuel cores by chemical and metallurgical techniques." The plant was known as the Feed Materials Production Center since the uranium fuel cores it produced were the 'feed' for the AEC's plutonium production reactors.

These nuclear reactors were located at Oak Ridge, Tennessee, the Savannah River Site in South Carolina and at Hanford in the state of Washington. The uranium metal produced was in the form of derbies, ingots, billets and fuel cores. The FMPC also served as the country's central repository for another radioactive metal, thorium.

The plant was located in the rural town of Fernald, which is about 20 miles (32 km) northwest of Cincinnati, Ohio, and occupies 1,050 acres (425 hectares). This location was chosen because it was between the uranium ore delivery ports of New York and New Orleans, and it was accessible to the other main AEC sites. In addition, the site was close to Cincinnati's large labor force, the landscape was level making the site's construction easy, it was isolated, which provided safety and security, and it was located 30 to 50 feet above a large water aquifer, which supplied the water needed for uranium metal processing. From 1951 to 1989 Fernald converted uranium ore into metal, and then fabricated this metal into target elements for nuclear reactors. Annual production rates ranged from a high in 1960 of 10,000 metric tons to a low in 1975 of 1,230 metric tons. Refining uranium metal was a process requiring a series of chemical and metallurgical conversions that occurred in nine specialized plants at the site.

Workers at the site were represented by the Fernald Atomic Trades and Labor Council.

Contamination
Releases from the Fernald site to the surrounding area resulted in exposure to community residents included ionizing radiation, soluble and insoluble forms of uranium, and various other hazardous chemicals. The Centers for Disease Control and Prevention (CDC) has conducted a historical exposure characterization and developed dose estimation models through the Fernald Dose Reconstruction Project, with an endpoint of developing an algorithm to estimate doses to individual persons who lived within the exposure assessment domain (the area within a ten kilometer radius from the center of the plant site). In addition to radioactive materials, many other non-radiological toxic substances were present in the production area as materials, by-products or products. Workers were exposed to chlorinated and non-chlorinated solvents, metals and metal salts, and nuisance dusts. Community residents may have been exposed to these substances through ground water pathways, soil contamination, and air dispersion of emissions from the site.

Medical surveillance
Two separate medical surveillance programs, for former workers and community residents, have been funded by settlements of class action litigation against National Lead of Ohio, a contractor for the Department of Energy. These Fernald Settlement Funds are administered by a US Federal Court, which maintains oversight of the Fernald Medical Monitoring Programs. The Fernald (Residents) Medical Monitoring Program (FMMP) is a voluntary ongoing medical surveillance program for community residents living within five miles of the perimeter of the Fernald site, and the Fernald Workers Medical Monitoring Program (FWMMP) is a program for former workers who were employed when National Lead of Ohio was the contractor. Activities of the medical monitoring programs include both periodic medical examinations and diagnostic testing and yearly questionnaire data collection. In January 2007, there were 9,764 persons enrolled in the FMMP and 2716 former workers enrolled in the FWMMP. The FMMP has an extensive computer database available for research studies. Samples of whole blood, serum, plasma and urine were obtained from all FMMP participants at the time of the initial examination, and over 100,000 one-ml aliquots of these biospecimens have been stored at −80 °C since then.

Death of Dave Bocks
In June 1984, 39-year-old pipe fitter, David "Dave" Bocks disappeared on shift and was reported missing. A witness reported seeing Bocks and a supervisor inside of a vehicle at about 4:00 AM with the windows rolled up on a hot night having a serious discussion. At 5:00 AM, the witness reported seeing Bocks and speaking with him, who stated he was putting up his tools and headed toward Plant 4. His remains were later discovered inside a uranium processing furnace located in Plant 6; a sudden 28-degree drop in furnace temperature (which was kept at a constant 1350 degrees F) had been recorded at 5:15 AM during the night of Bocks' disappearance. The investigations found insufficient evidence that foul play was involved. However, some, including Bocks' family, believed that he was murdered by one or more coworkers who suspected him of being a whistleblower in the 1984 nuclear emissions scandal.

Production facilities

Plant 1
The production process at the Fernald Feed Materials Production Center begins at Plant 1, also known as the Sampling Plant. The principal function of the Sampling Plant was to obtain representative samples of the large quantities of incoming ore concentrates. This plant was divided into two main processing lines, one for Q-11 and one for INX. Q-11 was the term used to refer to radium bearing ores primarily mined in the Belgian Congo while INX was a non-radium concentrate. The problem with handling radium bearing ores was that one of radium's daughter particles is radon: an invisible radioactive gas.

Q-11 was received in 55-gallon drums. The drums were deheaded before processing and were conveyed through a thawing tunnel, which also provided surge capacity of deheaded drums. The drums were lifted to the top of the building by a skip hoist where they were emptied into a surge hopper that feeds the magnetic separator and jaw crusher. From the jaw crusher, the one-half inch material passes through a rotary drum dryer to a system of conveyors, which conveys the material to a surge hopper that feeds the ring roll mill. The particle size output from the mill was controlled to about 100 mesh by an air classifier mounted directly on the mill. The undersized material was blown to a cyclone separator that was mounted directly above the first Gallagher sampler. The three Gallagher samplers in series each took a 10% cut of the stream fed to it, producing a sample approximately 0.1% of the original lot size. The main stream was conveyed to a drumming station where it was packaged in 55-gallon or 30-gallon drums for use in the Refinery. The official weight was taken at this point.

The INX line was similar to the Q-11 line except that the thawing tunnel has been omitted and a hammer mill and bucket elevator replaces the jaw crusher, rotary dryer, ring roll mill, air classifier, and cyclone separator.

In addition to sampling incoming ores this plant reconditions 30 and 55 gallon drums used to transport and store radioactive materials onsite. It also contains a safe-geometry digestion system used to process enriched uranium materials assaying up to 5% 235U. This digester was so named because the piping was of such a diameter and distance between pipes making a criticality incident nigh impossible.

Plant 2/3
Plant 2/3 was known as the Ore Refinery & Denitration Plant. It was called Plant 2/3 because two separate functions occur in the same building. Here uranium values were recovered from feed materials (i.e., ores, concentrates and residues) and were converted to concentrated uranium trioxide, also called orange salt. In addition to uranium, the Refinery was capable of extracting and purifying a number of different materials. The Ore Refinery consists of three major process areas designated digestion (Plant 2), extraction and denitration (Plant 3). Support areas include nitric acid recovery, raffinate treatment and refinery sump. The digestion, extraction, and raffinate areas included 'hot' and 'cold' sides. To provide radiation protection from the radium-bearing Q-11 ore [the "hot" material], concrete shielding was provided around appropriate process equipment and the 'hot' side of each area was enclosed by concrete walls.

The principal function of Plant 2/3 was uranium purification and conversion of uranium bearing materials into uranium trioxide (UO3), or orange oxide. There are three principal forms of uranium residues, each having a separate processing route for putting the uranium into solution. Uranium oxides are dissolved in 6000 gallon vats of pure nitric acid in the Oxide Digester (also known as the west metal dissolver), miscellaneous residues that required filtration were dissolved in the Slag Leach Digester, and metals were dissolved in the Metal Dissolver. If the ore was poured too rapidly into the nitric acid vats a condition known as a "boilover" results. The reaction generates so much gas that it becomes a foam and boils over the sides of the vat. Many workers were told to not step in any puddles on the floor as they were probably nitric acid left from one of these "boilover" incidents. The site employed their own cobblers just to repair work boots that had been exposed to too much acid. Another hazard was the nitrogen dioxide fumes coming off the nitric acid vats. There were so many fumes that on high humidity days during the summer there appeared to be an orange cloud encasing this building and anyone just walking past would experience a sensation as if he had wandered into a swarm of bees.

The resulting "UNH" (uranium nitrate hexahydrate) material pumped out of the vats was then processed through extraction to purify the solution. The UNH solution was passed through a multistage liquid-liquid counter current tower with tributyl phosphate and kerosene to extract the uranyl nitrate. The impurities exit the tower as the raffinate stream for further processing. The extract solution was passed through another counter current extraction tower to re-extract the uranyl nitrate from the kerosene into deionized water. The kerosene was then processed through a wash to be recycled back through the extraction process. The resulting UNH solution was now ready for further concentrating and thermal denitration.

The UNH solution was concentrated through a process known as "boildown". In this process, heat was applied to the solution from steam coils inside the boildown tanks. The water was removed through evaporation, thus concentrating the solution. The solution was concentrated from 90 grams uranium per liter to 1300 grams uranium per liter in two stages.

The concentrated solution now in 250 gallon batches was further heated, in a process known as Pot Denitration, to thermally denitrate the UNH to uranium trioxide. The uranium trioxide material was then pneumatically removed from the denitration pots and packaged out in hoppers with a capacity of 3.6 metric tons or 55 gallon drums. This pneumatic transfer of the product was known as Gulping.

Plant 4
The Green Salt Plant, the common name for Plant 4, produced "green salt" (uranium tetrafluoride) from UO3. Green salt was the key intermediate compound in the overall process of producing uranium metal. This plant contains 12 banks of furnaces for the conversion of uranium trioxide to uranium tetrafluoride. Each bank consists of four furnaces in series. The first furnace was constructed of stainless steel for the hydrogen reduction of orange oxide to uranium dioxide, by the reaction: UO3 + H2 → UO2 + H2O. The UO2 was then fed directly to the first of the next three furnaces in series. These furnaces were constructed of Inconel for the hydrofluorination of uranium dioxide to green salt. The reaction was: UO2 + 4HF → UF4 + 2H2O.

Orange oxide was received from the Refinery in five-ton mobile hoppers, which were mounted on seal hoppers to feed the reduction furnace at a rate of approximately 375 pounds per hour for producing metal grade UF4. The powder was agitated and carried through the reduction furnace by a ribbon flight screw. Dissociated ammonia was metered to the reduction reactors and passed counter-currently to the bed of uranium oxide within the chemical reactor. The off-gases from the reduction reactors were passed to a hydrogen burner where the excess hydrogen was burned and then passed through a dust collector to remove any entrained uranium dioxide that might have been present. The UO2 in the reduction furnace passed through a seal hopper and a feed screw to the first of the three hydrofluorination furnaces. The bed of UO2 was moved through the hydrofluorination furnace by ribbon flight screws and contacted counter-currently by hydrofluoric acid vapors. The UF4 was removed from the third furnace and conveyed to a packaging station where the product was packaged in 10-gallon pails for use in the Metal Plant, or in 5-ton containers for shipment to the cascades. The off-gases containing water vapor formed in the reaction and excess hydrofluoric acid was removed from the first furnace and were sent to hydrofluoric acid recovery. The gases first passed to a partial condenser that removed all of the water in the form of 70% aqueous hydrofluoric acid. The remainder of the gases was then passed to a total condenser, which condenses the remainder of the acid as anhydrous hydrofluoric acid. The gases at this point contain only the nitrogen from seals and purge gases and small amounts of hydrofluoric acid that did not condense in the total condenser. These were passed through potassium hydroxide scrubbers to remove the last traces of acid and then discharged to the atmosphere.

Plant 5
Plant 5, the Metals Production Plant main process equipment consisted of eleven jolters, five filling machines, forty-four reduction furnaces, two breakout stations in the Reduction Area and twenty-eight vacuum casting furnaces in the Recast Area.

The conversion of UF to metal was accomplished by the thermite reduction of green salt with magnesium in a refractory lined steel reaction vessel. 450 pounds of green salt were blended with approximately 72 pounds of magnesium. The resulting mixture was uniformly packed into the reduction "bomb", which has previously been lined with refractory slag in a jolting apparatus. Following these steps, the bomb was capped with refractory, sealed, and placed in one of 49 electric muffle furnaces. The furnace temperature was raised to approximately 1,225 °F and after about four hours the thermite type reduction reaction occurs: UF4 + 2Mg → 2MgF2 + U (metal). The charge was then allowed to separate and cool in the furnace for 10 minutes, after which it was removed and cooled to room temperature. Finally, the solidified uranium metal (derby) was separated from the slag and liner materials in a sequence of manual and mechanical operations that take place at the breakout station. The yields expected from this operation were about 95%. There are many documented explosions of these furnaces due to improperly packed refractory lining or a magnesium flare. Whatever the cause, the building would fill with radioactive smoke along with a real probability that molten uranium metal would come pouring out of the bottom of the furnace. 

The MgF2 slag from the breakout station was conveyed to the slag recycling plant, where it was stored awaiting processing for reuse as refractory liner. The slag recovery process consists of crushing, pulverizing, and classifying the slag, which was then transferred back to the reduction area for use.

The next step in the plant consists of melting massive uranium metal and casting an ingot. Graphite crucibles were loaded with a charge of derbies and solid recycle scrap. The loaded crucibles were then mechanically positioned in induction melting and casting furnaces that were designed to give a maximum of flexibility and a minimum of human exposure to radioactivity. The uranium metal was melted under high vacuum to minimize contamination of the melt with atmospheric gases and to permit purification of the metal by distillation of volatile contaminants. At approximately 2,550 °F, the molten metal was poured into a graphite mold and the ingot was allowed to cool and solidify. Additional equipment was provided for the ingot to be removed from the mold, weighed, cropped, sampled, and stored for further processing in the Metals Fabrication Plant [Plant 6]. The ingot was approximately 7" in diameter, by 45" long, and weighs about 1,200 pounds.

Plant 6
Plant 6 was known as the Metals Fabrication Plant. "Ingots from Plant 5 and MCW Mallinckrodt Chemical Works were bloomed into billets and then rolled into rods that were straightened and machined to finished reactor slug dimensions. The finished product consists of either hollow or solid uranium slugs, designed for both internal and external cooling during pile irradiation. The product shipped from Plant 6 must pass rigid inspection for dimensional tolerances, metal quality, and surface conditions."

Uranium ingots were charged into an automated ingot preheat furnace where they were lowered into a Li2CO3-K2CO3 molten salt to be heated to 1,150–1,200 °F before being discharged singly to the mill table. The ingot was passed back and forth through the blooming mill until it was reduced to an oval billet approximately 2" to 2½". The ends of the billet were then cut off by a cropping shear before it was pushed into an equalizing furnace. The billet was reheated to 1,150–1,200 °F in the equalizing furnace and was then discharged into the finishing mill. The finishing mill consists of six stands that reduce the rod to the final diameter of 1.43" for Hanford rods, and 1.12" for Savannah River rods.

The rods were cut into 22-foot lengths as they leave the last stand by means of a flying shear. The Savannah rods were air cooled to room temperature on the cooling bed and then were cold straightened in a Medart Straightener. Rods to be beta heat treated by-pass the cooling bed and were lifted into the beta heat treating furnace by means of a hoist, to be held at 1,320–1,365 °F for 11–20 minutes and then quenched in cold water. After quenching, these rods were conveyed to the Medart straightener for straightening. The rods were located in -inch Acme-Gridley automatic screw machines where slugs were cut from the rods. The Hanford slugs were then placed in the Heald machine, which cuts the slugs to desired lengths and finishes and radiuses the ends. The Savannah River slugs were reduced to exact dimensions of size, surface, and straightness on a centerless grinder after which a contour was placed on the surface by a thread rolling machine. The slugs were numbered and put on a basket on a conveyor that passes through a degreasing tank, pickling tank, two rinse tanks and a hot air dryer before depositing the slug basket in the Inspection Department. The slugs were inspected for seams, striations, dimensions and handling defects with the good slugs being packed for shipment.

In addition to the solid slugs produced in Plant 6, hollow fuel element production was started about January 1, 1956. Hollow slug blanks were produced oversize on a 2⅝" RB-6 Acme-Gridley machine and were centerless ground before the drilling operation. The oversize slug blank was then loaded into a magazine loader on a 1⅝" Acme and thence through a four-step drilling operation making a hole halfway through the blank. The blank was then reversed and again placed in the magazine loader. After a four-step drilling sequence produces a hole all the way through the blank, a reamer was passed through this hole in the final position. The oversize Outer Diameter was turned concentric with the finished Inner Diameter on an automatic Sundstrand lathe. Subsequent operations were the same as those for the solid slug.

Plant 7
Plant 7 was known as the 6 to 4 Plant because UF6 was converted to UF4 here. It was basically a high-temperature gas-to-solid reactor system that only operated for two years: 1954–1956. To produce UF4, the uranium hexafluoride was first heated to form a gaseous compound and was then reduced to UF4. The reduction occurs in a reaction with hydrogen. UF6 vapor and hydrogen will be mixed at the top of each reactor by means of a cyclonic type mixer. The bulk of the reduction reaction will occur at the top of the reactor. The UF4 formed will be a powdery solid that falls like snow to the bottom of the reactor.

Plant 8
The Scrap Recovery Plant, the name given to Plant 8, process primarily involves upgrading uranium recycle materials from FMPC and off-site operations to prepare feed materials for head-end processing in the Refinery. Operations include drum washing, filtering Refinery tailings, operation of rotary kiln, box, muffle, and oxidation furnaces, and screening of furnace products.

Bomb liner material received from Plant 5 in mobile hoppers was emptied at an unloading station and elevated to a surge hopper. Material as needed was sent from the surge hopper through a jaw crusher and into a shelf type oxidation furnace. Here the metallic uranium was oxidized to triuranium octoxide (U3O8). The material discharged from the furnace was lifted to a surge hopper and then as needed was sent through a roll mill and ground to -325 mesh size. It was then fed into carbon brick digestion tanks where the uranium was dissolved in hydrochloric acid containing a little sodium chlorate. The undissolved solids were filtered off and dumped into a truck, which hauls the spent material to a scrap dump. Uranium in the filtrate was sent to a precipitation tank and precipitated with ammonium hydroxide (NH4OH), in presence of phosphoric acid to form UAP (uranyl ammonium phosphate). The resulting slurry was filtered and the uranium bearing cake was introduced to a drying furnace. The dried UAP was sent to the refinery. In addition to the wet system described, several furnaces were installed in the plant for massive metal oxidation, pyrohydrolysis, drying, chip and sludge combustion, etc. Most of the furnaces can be used for more than one of the above operations.

During the summer of 1962, a new facility was started in Plant 8 for the production of UF4 by an aqueous precipitation technique known as the Winlo process. The Winlo process was developed for the low-cost chemical conversion of relatively pure uranium concentrates to green salt by a hydrometallurgical process. The feed to the plant Winlo system was made up of a combination of black oxide (U3O8) generated by burning metallic residues, uranyl chloride solutions generated by dissolving massive metal residues in hydrochloric acid, and UAP produced from low-grade residues in the hydrometallurgical recovery system.

A brief description of the Winlo process follows:
 1. UAP (UO2NH4PO4) and (U3O8) were introduced through a new dumping station into an existing digester. Water, hydrochloric and nitric acids, and copper sulfate were added to the digester and the resultant slurry was agitated and heated to 200 °F by means of a new heat exchanger.
 The digested slurry was pumped to an existing Oliver precoat rotary filter.
 The filter cake was dropped to a drumming station, and the filtrate was pumped to one of two new agitated precipitation tanks. Each of these tanks contained a heat exchanger to heat the filtrate to 200 °F. Thirty percent hydrofluoric acid was metered to the filtrate from a storage tank. Then a metered quantity of sulfur dioxide was added from a storage tank during a period of 3 to 5 hours.
 The precipitated green salt was dropped by gravity to a pan-type filter where the green salt was washed and dried.
 The filtrate from the pan filter was neutralized in a new system and pumped to the chemical pit. The filter cake was dropped to a holoflite conveyor where it dried to UF4*3/4H2O and conveyed to a mobile hopper.
 These hoppers were transported to the Green Salt Plant and placed over an unused bank of reactors. The material was fed to these reactors countercurrent to a flow of anhydrous HF. The reactors were heated to 850 °F to dehydrate the green salt hydrate, and the reactor bank product was blended with regular production green salt in existing equipment. The diluted hydrofluoric acid gas was handled by the existing off-gas system.

Plant 9
The primary purpose of Plant 9, the Special Products Plant was to process slightly enriched uranium and to cast larger ingots than those produced in Plant 5. The plant contains facilities for producing derbies, ingots, slugs, and washers of various enrichments. Construction of the plant as a thorium metal production process was completed in 1954 and the thorium process was begun in October 1954. Plant 9 was originally designed and constructed as a thorium metal production plant, yet had to be regarded as a semi-development works because of a lack of process information. The two basic processes, hydrofluoric acid precipitation of thorium fluoride and induction de-zincing and melting, which were used to start the plant, were not able to produce a pure metal. However, improvement in production techniques permitted the eventual development of an oxalate precipitation process capable of producing pure thorium metal. Interest in this item declined during the 1956–1957 period and the plant operations evolved to the casting of enriched uranium ingots larger than those being processed in the Metals Production and Metals Fabrication Plants. Ingots were cast up to 13-inch diameter, 38-inch length and having a weight approaching 2,000 pounds. As such the processes and equipment used were almost identical to those of Plants 5 and 6.

Pilot Plant
The Pilot Plant consists of small size equipment for piloting refinery operations, hexafluoride reduction, derby pickling, ingot casting, and other equipment for special purposes. This plant was used for numerous process testing and experimental operations as well as being employed as a production facility for various processes. In the early years, derbies were produced there, in the manner described in Plant 5. Another process operated on a production scale was the direct conversion of uranium hexafluoride to green salt. This production process was operated with UF6 that contained as much as 2.5% U235. A two-step procedure was used. First was the vaporization of UF6: solid UF6 in large 10 or 14 ton cylinders were heated in autoclaves at approximately 110 °C to produce gaseous UF6. The next step was the reduction of the UF6 gas, which involved mixing it with hydrogen gas at 480–650 °C in metal reactors to produce UF4 powder. Hydrogen fluoride was a valuable byproduct of the reaction, which was: UF6 + H2 → UF4 + 2HF. In addition, most of the thorium production activity at the FMPC took place inside the Pilot Plant. Thorium production activities began in 1964 and continued until 1980.

The Pilot Plant met the needs of development projects and special orders. Some of the equipment that was available for and had been used in enriched processing was as follows:
 Oxidation Furnace: with special high-temperature steel alloy pans enclosed cooling and unloading, and special two-stage dust collection.
 Vacuum Furnaces: two furnaces, with perclene cooling, and all auxiliaries including vacuum pumps, three power hacksaws, crucible and mold preparation facilities, and dust collection have been used at temperatures up to 3,360 °F (for melting thorium).
 Reduction to Metal: two systems representing step-down of size reduction in two stages from the full-scale production units for reducing UF4 to metal were available in the Pilot Plant. The smaller system can handle full enrichments, the other intermediate enrichments Reduction pots, blenders, mandrels, furnaces and all auxiliary equipment were available for use as required.
 Heat Treating: a large, versatile, salt-bath unit was available with quench baths of molten salt, molten metal, water, or oil and a fast acting hoist.
 Shot-Blast Cleaning Unit: this unit can clean castings of any shape up to four feet in the largest dimension and employs uranium shot as the blasting medium.
 Machining Chips Recovery System: consisting of a chip crusher, washing system, pickling, drying, and finally briquetting in a hydraulic press. The machine has been used on materials enriched up to 2% U-235.
 Solvent Extraction System: three versatile sets of extraction columns, 2-inches, 6-inches and 9-inches in diameter, were available with all auxiliaries. This includes digesters, fume scrubbers, pumps, controls, boildown system, neutralizer, filters, and more than 12 stainless steel tanks ranging from 100 to 8000 gallons in capacity.
 Dry Preparation System: this includes two crushers, a small continuous ball mill, a multi-split mechanical screen, and a large dust collection system.
 UF6 Hydrolysis - UO2 Precipitation: a system for efficiently absorbing quantities of UF6 in water at rates up to 800 pounds per hour was available. The UO2F2-HF solution can then be neutralized to ammonium diuranate, filtered, washed, and dried to UO2 using components of the system previously described above.
 Calciner: a small (6-inch diameter) Inconel-tube rotary calciner with precision electric heating was available for jobs such as UF4 dehydration, ADU (Ammonia Diuranate) calcining, and the like. Its small size meets geometry limits for nuclear safety.
 Decladding: a rubber-lined tank was set up and used as needed to remove zirconium cladding from reject fuel cores. Equipment for removal of other metals, such as steel or aluminum, was available also.
 UF6 to UF4 Production Facility: conversion UF6 to UF4 using cracked ammonia. HF was produced as a by-product.

Fernald Closure Project

The Fernald Closure Project is a program run by the United States Department of Energy to clean up the former uranium processing site Fernald Feed Materials Production Center.

In 1990, Congress approved closure of the site and environmental cleanup of the facility. Fluor Fernald, part of the Fluor Corporation, was awarded the contract in 1992 for cleanup of the site. Fluor Fernald completed their portion of the cleanup in October 2006, 12 years ahead of schedule and 7.8 billion dollars below the original cost estimate. The waste was permanently buried at Waste Control Specialists.

The site is permanently unfit for human habitation, according to federal scientists, and "will have to be closely monitored essentially forever."

Cleanup costs were estimated at $1 billion over 10 years.

Fernald Preserve

The $4.4 billion cleanup of the surface areas was completed in December 2006, and the site was turned into the Fernald Preserve nature preserve. Thousands of tons of contaminated concrete, sludge, liquid waste, and soil were removed from the site and replaced with man-made wetlands and greenery.

Ongoing cleanup operations include routine monitoring of the environmental conditions with test wells, including the uranium groundwater plume extending south of the plant area, storage of residual waste onsite, and filtering of uranium contamination from the Great Miami River aquifer. These cleanup operations, along with restrictions on establishing new wells in areas exceeding water contaminant limits, will continue for the foreseeable future.

Citations

General references 

 Golightly, Eric J. Site History of the Fernald Environmental Management Project. US Department of Energy, Office of Environmental Restoration & Waste Management. History Associates Incorporated. January, 1993.
 Ross, K. N., et al. Exposure Study of Plant 1 Personnel to Airborne Radioactive Dust. Health and Safety Division, National Lead Company of Ohio. April 9, 1968.
 Industrial Hygiene Branch, Health and Safety Laboratory, National Lead Company of Ohio. Feed Materials Processing Center Preliminary Survey-Plants 1,2,3, and 7: Occupational Exposure to Airborne Contaminants. September 8, 1953.
 Ross, K. N., et al. Exposure Study of Plants 2&3 Personnel to Airborne Radiaoactive Dust. Health and Safety Division, National Lead Company of Ohio. 1967.
 Industrial Hygiene Branch, Health and Safety Laboratory, National Lead Company of Ohio. Feed Materials Processing Center Plant 4, Occupational Exposures to Airborne Contaminants. July 7, 1955.
 Ross, K. N., et al. Exposure Study of Plant 4 Personnel to Airborne Radioactive Dust 1967. Health and Safety Division, National Lead Company of Ohio. April 24, 1968.
 Boback, Michael W. and Richard C. Heatherton. Recent Bio-Assay Activities at National Lead Company of Ohio. NLCO-933. September 28, 1964.
 Ross, K. N., et al. Exposure Study of Plant 6 Rolling Mill Personnel to Airborne Radioactive Dust. Health and Safety Division, National Lead Company of Ohio. March 14, 1968.
 Ross, K. N., et al. Exposure Study of Plant 8 Personnel to Airborne Radioactive Dust. Health and Safety Division, National Lead Company of Ohio. April 16, 1968.
 Costa, James J. Operations Procedure Manual for the Sampling Plant (Preliminary). Production Division, National Lead Company of Ohio. June 5, 1952.
 Consiglio, J. T. Procedures for Handling African Metals Corporation Materials at Fernald. FMPC-164. Production Division, National Lead Company of Ohio. August 1952.
 Yarborough, Charles E. and Frank L. Chinery. Standard Operating Procedure for Q-11 Ore (Pitchblende) at Fernald Sampling Plant. NLCO-560. Production Division, National Lead of Ohio. April 1, 1955.
 "Description of the Feed Materials Production Center, Fernald Area Office." Compiled by the Fernald Area Staff. Reproduced by the Reports and Control Branch, Oak Ridge Operations Office. January 1958.
 Andrew, E. A., et al. "Digestion of Uranium Ore Concentrates in a Continuous, Three-Stage System." Summary Technical Report for the Period October 1, 1961, to December 31, 1961. NLCO-845. January 24, 1962.
 Cavendish, J. H. Re-Extraction of Uranium from Tri-n-Butyl Phosphate-Kerosene Solvent. NLCO-883. August 30, 1963.
 Huntington, C. W. and W. Burkhardt. Denitration of Uranyl Nitrate by a Continuous-Pot Process. NLCO-854. October 22, 1962.
 Wolf, R. B. Standard Operating Procedure for Plant 2 Hot Raffinate Treatment. FMPC-283. Production Division, National Lead Company of Ohio. July 23, 1953.
 Standard Operating Procedure for Plant 2 Refinery Sump Recovery System. FMPC-229. n. d.
 National Lead Company of Ohio, Contract Operator of the Feed Materials Production Center for the U.S. Atomic Energy Commission. The Feed Materials Production Center. NCLO-950. n. d.
 Scheidler, T.P. "The Recovery of Uranium from Magnesium Fluoride Slag via a Low Temperature Nitric Acid Leaching Process." Summary Technical Report for the Period April 1, 1964, to June 30, 1964. NLCO-920. August 19, 1964.
 Savage, J. Mead and R. Fugate. History of the Operation of the Feed Materials Production Center. National Lead Company of Ohio, Inc. est. date March, 1985.
 Toye, R. H. Standard Operating Procedure for Operation of the Orange Oxide Pneumatic Conveying System. NLCO-546. Production Division, National Lead of Ohio. March 30, 1955.
 Melius, James. Historic FMPC Process Descriptions. October 30, 1989.
 Torbeck, F. W. et al. Standard Operating Procedures of Plant #4. FMPC-96. National Lead Company of Ohio. n. d.
 Cahalane, Robert and Frank Torbeck. Standard Operating Procedure for Plant 4 – Reactor Area. FMPC-297. Production Division, National Lead Company of Ohio. August 27, 1953.
 Mahaffey, J. W. and Plant 5 Staff. Standard Operating Procedure for Metal Production. FMPC-108. Division, National Lead Company of Ohio. January 16, 1953.
 Yocco, A. S. Standard Operating Procedure – Rolling Mill Section – Building 3006 [Plant 6]. FMPC-95 Rev. 2. Production Division, National Lead Company of Ohio. January 1953.
 Magoun, John W. Jr. Standard Operating Procedure for Plant 6 – Rolling Mill. NLCO-598. Production Division, National Lead of Ohio. November 1, 1955.
 Gardener, R. L. UF6 to UF4 Operator Training Program. National Lead of Ohio, Inc. November 28, 1984.
 Cavendish, J. H. Development and Application of the Winlo Process for the Production of Uranium Tetrafluoride. NLCO-974. June, 1966.
 A Closer Look at Uranium Metal Production: A Technical Overview. Feed Materials Production Center, Fernald, OH. Date of Issue: March 1988.
 Uranium Feed Materials Production Center. Operated by National Lead of Ohio, Inc. for the Department of Energy. Est. Date 1984.
 Cavendish, J. H. et al. Hydrometallurgical Processing of Uranium-Bearing Residue Materials to UF4. NLCO-873. February, 1963.
 Burgett, R. "Production of UF4 by the Winlo Process" in Highlights - Research and Development Accomplishments. NLCO-872. March 25, 1963.
 Kleinsmith, Paul L. Standard Operating Procedure for Production of Thorium Ingots. NLCO-641. Production Division, National Lead of Ohio. June 21, 1956.
 Palmer, Willard E. Standard Operating Procedure for Pilot Plant – Metallurgical Area. Reduction to Metal of Enriched UF4 Containing Up To 3% U-235. NLCO-668 (Rev. 2). Technical Division, National Lead of Ohio. April 27, 1960.
 Palmer, Willard E. Standard Operating Procedure for Pilot Plant – Metallurgical Area. Melting and Casting Uranium Metal Containing Up To 3% U-235. NLCO-691 (Rev. 1). Technical Division, National Lead of Ohio. September 5, 1957, Revised May 25, 1959.
 Nelli, Joseph R. Standard Operating Procedure for Two-Inch Pulse Column. NLCO-614. Technical Division, National Lead of Ohio. February 27, 1956.

External links
The following are links that provide additional information about the Fernald site and the health risks associated with its processes:
 A brief description of the history of the site was issued on the 50th anniversary of the opening of the plant.
 Fernald Closure Project website which includes old photos as well as more links. Use of the SiteMap will help to quickly find information.
 The Centers for Disease Control, National Center for Environmental Health, Radiation Studies, Project Profiles, Fernald, includes a description of the Fernald Dosimetry Reconstruction Project.
 The CDC's Fernald Risk Assessment Project
 CDC National Center for Environmental Health, Radiation Studies, Project Profiles, Fernald. Includes a description of the Fernald Dosimetry Reconstruction Project and the Fernald Risk Assessment Project.
 Fernald Risk Assessment Project—CDC
 CDC Background description of the Fernald Risk Assessment Project
 Where to find more information on Cancer—CDC
 A first-hand account of work at Fernald Feed materials Production Center
 

Buildings and structures in Butler County, Ohio
Environmental disasters in the United States
Buildings and structures in Hamilton County, Ohio
Nuclear weapons infrastructure of the United States
United States Department of Energy facilities
Superfund sites in Ohio
Waste disposal incidents in the United States